Belouis Some is the second studio album from British new wave musician Belouis Some, which was released in 1987.

Background
The release of Some's debut solo album Some People in 1985 spawned two hits the following year; "Imagination" and "Some People", both of which were Top 40 UK hits and Top 10 American Hot Dance Club Play hits. After his initial chart success and extensive touring, he appeared at Knebworth on a bill supporting Queen, with Big Country and Status Quo in August 1986. The late 1986 single "Jerusalem" had also peaked at #98 in the UK. Soon after, Some recorded his second album, Belouis Some in New York, which was produced by Gary Langan and Guy Fletcher. Pete Townshend and Julian Lennon made guest appearances on the record, while Phil Harding mixed "Let It Be with You". Of the nine tracks, Some solely wrote five of the songs and co-wrote the rest, three of which were co-written with producer Guy Fletcher. "Some Girls" was co-written by Carlos Alomar.

The album was recorded at Right Track in New York City, and mixed at both the Eel Pie in Twickenham and Maison Rouge in London. Additional recording was at Counterpoint, Hit Factory, Roundhouse & Beat Factory.

However, like his debut album, Belouis Some did not make a chart appearance in the UK or the United States. "Let It Be with You" was the lead single from the album, and managed to reach #53 in the UK chart. It fared better in the United States on the Hot Dance Club Play chart, where it reached #13. The second single "Animal Magic" failed to make an appearance on the UK chart, but a remix version reached #6 on the Hot Dance Club Play chart. The third and final single "Some Girls" was exclusively released in the UK during early 1988, and peaked at #76. This was the last charting Belouis Some made in the UK.

Some wouldn't release his next and final studio album Living Your Life until 1993, although in 1989 he formed the band The Big Broadcast, and the band toured the UK playing small venues and clubs.

Release
Belouis Some was released by Parlophone/EMI Records in the UK, Europe, Australia and South Africa, and by Capitol Records in the US and Canada. It was released on vinyl LP, cassette and CD. Today the album remains out-of-print. The CD version of the album featured one bonus track; the 12" extended remix of "Let It Be with You".

Critical reception
Upon its release in the US, Billboard felt several songs on the album had "pop potential", including "My Body". Cash Box stated, "Passionate, assured work from the blond soulster, who steps out smartly on his second LP. Full of fat brass, moody keys, Carlos Alomar's razor-thin guitar and the pouty vocals of Belouis Some, this wax packs some punch. Smooth with fangs, circa Simply Red or the Blow Monkeys." Scott Benarde of The Palm Beach Post commented, "It took Some doing but Belouis has improved his songwriting and followed up his debut with an album of polished, hook-filled romantic pop songs that commercial radio should find tempting. Y-NOT will add the breezy, hopping 'Stranger than Fiction', the somber ballad 'Some Girls' and the dreamy 'Animal Magic'."

Tim Blangger of The Morning Call said, "This LP is considerably toned down from his debut, which was filled with muscular rock and brassy funk. 'Let It Be with You' and 'Stranger than Fiction' are sensuous R&B cuts which retain a funky, jazzy feel while 'Dream Girl' and the remainder of Side 2 are 'dreamy' slower songs. This is a decent effort and worth a listen." Jeff Bunch of the Spokane Chronicle commented, "This effort is more consistent than his 1985 debut effort. But the limited range of his Billy Idol-like voice and overall weakness of his material makes one wonder whether he'll ever make it big."

Track listing

Personnel
 Belouis Some – vocals
Carlos Alomar, Chester Kamen (tracks 4, 6–7), Neal X (track 4), Pete Townshend (track 9) – guitar
Carmine Rojas (tracks 1–2, 4, 6, 8–9), Gary Twigg (track 7) – bass
Guy Fletcher – keyboards
Geoff Dugmore (tracks 1–2, 4–9) – drums
Jimmy Maelen – percussion
 Lenny Pickett (track 3) – saxophone
Earl Gardner – trumpet (tracks 1-2)
The Borneo Horns – brass (tracks 1-2)
Carlos Alomar, Gary Langan (tracks 4, 8), Geoff Dugmore (track 5), Gordon Grodie, Guy Fletcher (tracks 4, 8), Morris Michael (track 5), Robin Clark – backing vocals
Gary Langan (tracks 1, 3, 9), Guy Fletcher (tracks 2, 4–8) – arrangements
Technical
Gary Langan – producer, recording, mixing 
Guy Fletcher – associate producer
Chris Ludwinski, Craig Vogel, Graeme Holdaway, John Palmer, Paul Borg, Rick Slater, Scott Mabuchi – engineer
Phil Harding – mixing (track 1) 
Eric Watson – photography
Accident – artwork design

References

1987 albums
Belouis Some albums
Albums produced by Guy Fletcher
Parlophone albums
Capitol Records albums
EMI Records albums